Yury Chyzh (Yury Chizh, born 1963) is a Belarusian businessman, believed to be one of the country's richest people. According to estimates, he is the second-wealthiest businessman in Belarus, the first being Vladimir Peftiev. On March 23, 2012, Chyzh was included in EU's travel ban list because of his alleged ties to the regime of Alexander Lukashenko.

Early life 
Yury chyzh was born in the village Sabali, Biaroza Raion, Brest Province in south-western Belarus.

He graduated from the electronic technical faculty of the Belarusian Polytechnical Institute. After graduation he made a career at the Minsk Tractor Plant and became head of energy supply of one of the factory's facilities.

As a businessman 

In 1994 Yury Chyzh established his company, Triple, which is active in construction business and production of construction materials.

In the following years his business expanded into production of non-alcoholic drinks (AquaTriple), production of aluminium constructions, transport and several other areas. Yury Chyzh owns the prominent restaurant and brewery Rakauski brovar in Minsk.

In 1999 Chyzh became member of the Council on development of entrepreneurship under the President of Belarus Alexander Lukashenko.

Social activity 
Yury Chyzh is president of the FC Dinamo Minsk. Since 2008, he is head of the Belarusian national wrestling federation.

Family 
Yury Chyzh is married with two sons and a daughter.

References

External list 
 Найбагацейшыя людзі Беларусі
 Triple Group official website

People from Byaroza District
Belarusian businesspeople
1963 births
Living people
FC Dinamo Minsk